Dendrobium aduncum (the angelfish orchid or inward-bent dendrobium) is a species of orchid. It is native to southern  China (Guangdong, Guangxi, Guizhou, Hainan, Hunan, Yunnan), the eastern Himalayas (Assam, Sikkim, Arunachal Pradesh, Bhutan, Myanmar), and northern Indochina (Laos, Thailand, Vietnam). It is an epiphyte and grows on the tree trunks of mountain forests.

References

External links
IOSPE orchid photos, Dendrobium aduncum Lindl. 1842, Photo courtesy of Patricia Harding
Ricardo's Blog, orchids, parrots, fish and people: Dendrobium aduncum Lindl. 1842, some curious translucid flowers
Andy's Orchids (Encinitas California USA), Genus: Dendrobium Species: aduncum Origin: Burma
Clear Mountain Garden Treasures
钩状石斛 Dendrobium aduncum Lindl. - Flora Republicae Popularis Sinicae 《中国植物志》 
Hoa dong noi, Hoàng Thảo Thập Hoa / Hồng Câu (Dendrobium aduncum Lindl.)

aduncum
Flora of East Himalaya
Flora of Indo-China
Flora of the Indian subcontinent
Orchids of China
Orchids of India
Plants described in 1842